Praealticus bilineatus is a species of combtooth blenny found in coral reefs in the western Pacific Ocean.

References

bilineatus
Taxa named by Wilhelm Peters
Fish described in 1868